The iconic characters in Dungeons & Dragons are a series of characters developed for the 3rd edition of the Dungeons & Dragons role-playing game used as recurring characters in illustrations and text explanations to illustrate archetypal D&D race and class combinations. In the case of a few classes, there is more than one iconic character, allowing for more varied iconic parties. They were created by and served as player characters for the developers during the creation and testing of the Third Edition rules.

Iconic characters are primarily of the 11 core classes; while iconic characters exist for other standard classes, they are not as well known. The iconic characters appear in a variety of Dungeons & Dragons books, including the Player's Handbook, Dungeon Master's Guide, and Enemies and Allies.

The iconic characters for the core classes are also the focus of a series of Dungeon & Dragons tie-in novels by T. H. Lain, a collective pseudonym adopted by a number of Wizards of the Coast staff. Three of the characters, Lidda, Krusk, and Jozan, were used as an audio commentary on the DVD release of Dungeons & Dragons: Wrath of the Dragon God.

Iconic characters

By character class (including gender) 
(Most commonly used character in bold)
 Barbarian: Krusk (half-orc male)
 Bard: Gimble (gnome male), Devis (half-elf male)
 Cleric: Jozan (human male cleric of Pelor), Eberk (dwarf male cleric of Moradin)
 Druid: Vadania (half-elf female)
 Fighter: Tordek (Dwarf male), Regdar (Human male)
 Monk: Ember (human female)
 Paladin: Alhandra (human female)
 Ranger: Soveliss (elf male)
 Rogue: Lidda (halfling female), Kerwyn (human male)
 Sorcerer: Hennet (human male), Aramil (elf male)
 Wizard: Mialee (elf female), Naull (human female), Nebin (gnome male illusionist),

By name and publication order 
 Regdar, Human Fighter (two D&D miniatures)
 Tordek, Dwarf Fighter (two D&D miniatures)
 Alhandra, Human Paladin
 Krusk, Half-Orc Barbarian (D&D miniature)
 Soveliss, Elf Ranger
 Jozan, Human Cleric of Pelor (D&D miniature)
 Eberk, Dwarf Cleric (D&D miniature)
 Lidda, Halfling Rogue (two D&D miniatures)
 Mialee, Elf Wizard (D&D miniature)
 Hennet, Human Sorcerer
 Aramil, Elf Sorcerer (D&D miniature)
 Gimble, Gnome Bard
 Devis, Half-Elf Bard (D&D miniature)
 Nebin, Gnome Illusionist (D&D miniature)
 Ember, Human Monk (D&D miniature)
 Vadania, Half-Elf Druid (D&D miniature)
 Kerwyn, Human Rogue (D&D miniature)
 Naull, Human Wizard
 Athain, Half-Elf Hexblade
 Korrin, Human Marshal
 Deruwyn, Scout
 Meara, Human Swashbuckler
 Morthos, Human Warlock
 Arthon, Human Warmage
 Sorra, Human Favored Soul
 Ialdabode, Human Psion (Telepath)
 Mitra, Human Psion (Shaper)
 Kazak, Dwarf Psion (Kineticist)
 Ragnara, Maenad Psychic Warrior
 Sandharrow, Half-Giant Psychic Warrior
 Eulad, Maenad Wilder
 Xerxes, Xeph Soulknife

References

Iconic